

Awallamaya (Aymara awalla the first one of two newborn girls, maya one, amaya merlon / dead boy / beloved or very dear son or daughter / lazy / dead / skinny or weak person, hispanicized spelling Aguallamaya) is a lake in Bolivia located in the La Paz Department, Ingavi Province, Jesús de Machaca Municipality, near the village Awallamaya. Its surface area is 96 km².

See also 
 Chilla-Kimsa Chata mountain range
 Jach'a Jawira
 Thujsa Jawira
 Qhunqhu Wankani

References 

Lakes of La Paz Department (Bolivia)